In functional analysis and related areas of mathematics, a metrizable (resp. pseudometrizable) topological vector space (TVS) is a TVS whose topology is induced by a metric (resp. pseudometric). An LM-space is an inductive limit of a sequence of locally convex metrizable TVS.

Pseudometrics and metrics

A pseudometric on a set  is a map  satisfying the following properties:
;
Symmetry: ;
Subadditivity: 

A pseudometric is called a metric if it satisfies: 
Identity of indiscernibles: for all  if  then 

Ultrapseudometric

Strong/Ultrametric triangle inequality: 

Pseudometric space

A pseudometric space is a pair  consisting of a set  and a pseudometric  on  such that 's topology is identical to the topology on  induced by  We call a pseudometric space  a metric space (resp. ultrapseudometric space) when  is a metric (resp. ultrapseudometric).

Topology induced by a pseudometric

If  is a pseudometric on a set  then collection of open balls:
forms a basis for a topology on  that is called the -topology or the pseudometric topology on  induced by  

Pseudometrizable space

A topological space  is called pseudometrizable (resp. metrizable, ultrapseudometrizable) if there exists a pseudometric (resp. metric, ultrapseudometric)  on  such that  is equal to the topology induced by

Pseudometrics and values on topological groups

An additive topological group is an additive group endowed with a topology, called a group topology, under which addition and negation become continuous operators. 

A topology  on a real or complex vector space  is called a vector topology or a TVS topology if it makes the operations of vector addition and scalar multiplication continuous (that is, if it makes  into a topological vector space). 

This is because despite it making addition and negation continuous, a group topology on a vector space  may fail to make scalar multiplication continuous. 
For instance, the discrete topology on any non-trivial vector space makes addition and negation continuous but do not make scalar multiplication continuous.

Translation invariant pseudometrics

Translation invariance: ;

Value/G-seminorm

Non-negative: 
Subadditive: ;

Symmetric: 

where we call a G-seminorm a G-norm if it satisfies the additional condition:
Total/Positive definite: If  then

Properties of values

If  is a value on a vector space  then:
The set  is an additive subgroup of

Equivalence on topological groups

Pseudometrizable topological groups

An invariant pseudometric that doesn't induce a vector topology

What fails is that scalar multiplication isn't continuous on  

This example shows that a translation-invariant (pseudo)metric is  enough to guarantee a vector topology, which leads us to define paranorms and F-seminorms.

Additive sequences

A collection  of subsets of a vector space is called additive if for every  there exists some  such that 

All of the above conditions are consequently a necessary for a topology to form a vector topology. 
Additive sequences of sets have the particularly nice property that they define non-negative continuous real-valued subadditive functions. 
These functions can then be used to prove many of the basic properties of topological vector spaces and also show that a Hausdorff TVS with a countable basis of neighborhoods is metrizable. The following theorem is true more generally for commutative additive topological groups. 

Assume that  always denotes a finite sequence of non-negative integers and use the notation: 
 

For any integers  and  
 

From this it follows that if  consists of distinct positive integers then  

It will now be shown by induction on  that if  consists of non-negative integers such that  for some integer  then  

It is clear that  and that  so to prove that  is subadditive, it suffices to prove that  when  are such that  which implies that  
This is an exercise. 
If all  are symmetric then  if and only if  from which it follows that  and  
If all  are balanced then the inequality  for all unit scalars  such that  is proved similarly. 
Because  is a nonnegative subadditive function satisfying  as described in the article on sublinear functionals,  is uniformly continuous on  if and only if  is continuous at the origin. 
If all  are neighborhoods of the origin then for any real  pick an integer  such that  so that  implies  
If the set of all  form basis of balanced neighborhoods of the origin then it may be shown that for any  there exists some  such that  implies

Paranorms

Both of the conditions:
 if  and if  is such that  then ;
 if  then  for every scalar 
Both of the conditions:
 if  then 
Separate continuity:
 if  for some scalar  then  for every ;
 if  is a scalar,  and  then  .

A paranorm is called total if in addition it satisfies:
Total/Positive definite:  implies

Properties of paranorms

If  is a paranorm on a vector space  then:
the set  is a vector subspace of 
 with 
If a paranorm  satisfies  and scalars  then  is absolutely homogeneity (i.e. equality holds) and thus  is a seminorm.

Examples of paranorms

If  is a paranorm on  then so is the map 
Every positive scalar multiple of a paranorm (resp. total paranorm) is again such a paranorm (resp. total paranorm).
Every seminorm is a paranorm.
The restriction of an paranorm (resp. total paranorm) to a vector subspace is an paranorm (resp. total paranorm).
The sum of two paranorms is a paranorm.
Each of the following real-valued maps are paranorms on :
  
 
The function is a paranorm on  that is  balanced but nevertheless equivalent to the usual norm on  Note that the function  is subadditive.
<li>

F-seminorms

Non-negative: 
Subadditive:  for all 
Balanced:  for  all scalars  satisfying 
For every   as 
 The sequence  can be replaced by any positive sequence converging to the zero.

An F-seminorm is called an F-norm if in addition it satisfies:
Total/Positive definite:  implies 

An F-seminorm is called monotone if it satisfies:
Monotone:  for all non-zero  and all real  and  such that 

F-seminormed spaces

An F-seminormed space (resp. F''-normed space) is a pair  consisting of a vector space  and an F-seminorm (resp. F-norm)  on  

Every isometric embedding of one F-seminormed space into another is a topological embedding, but the converse is not true in general. 

Examples of F-seminorms

Every positive scalar multiple of an F-seminorm (resp. F-norm, seminorm) is again an F-seminorm (resp. F-norm, seminorm).
The sum of finitely many F-seminorms (resp. F-norms) is an F-seminorm (resp. F-norm).
The restriction of an F-seminorm (resp. F-norm) to a vector subspace is an F-seminorm (resp. F-norm).
In particular, every seminorm is an F-seminorm.
For any  the map  on  defined by 
 
is an F-norm that is not a norm.
If  is a linear map and if  is an F-seminorm on  then  is an F-seminorm on 

Properties of F-seminorms

Every F-seminorm is a paranorm and every paranorm is equivalent to some F-seminorm.  

Topology induced by a single F-seminorm

Topology induced by a family of F-seminorms

Suppose that  is a non-empty collection of F-seminorms on a vector space  and for any finite subset  and any  let 
 

The set  forms a filter base on  that also forms a neighborhood basis at the origin for a vector topology on  denoted by   Each  is a balanced and absorbing subset of   These sets satisfy

 is the coarsest vector topology on  making each  continuous.
 is Hausdorff if and only if for every non-zero  there exists some  such that 
If  is the set of all continuous F-seminorms on  then 

Fréchet combination

Suppose that  is a family of non-negative subadditive functions on a vector space  

  

As an F-seminorm

Then  is an F-seminorm on  that induces the same locally convex topology as the family  of seminorms. 

Since  is increasing, a basis of open neighborhoods of the origin consists of all sets of the form  as  ranges over all positive integers and  ranges over all positive real numbers. 

The translation invariant pseudometric on  induced by this F-seminorm  is 

This metric was discovered by Fréchet in his 1906 thesis for the spaces of real and complex sequences with pointwise operations.  

As a paranorm

This is also true of the following paranorms on :

Generalization

The Fréchet combination can be generalized by use of a bounded remetrization function. 

A  is a continuous non-negative non-decreasing map  that has a bounded range, is subadditive (meaning that   for all ), and satisfies  if and only if  

Examples of bounded remetrization functions include    and  

Then 

defines a bounded F-seminorm that is uniformly equivalent to the  
It has the property that for any net  in   if and only if  for all  
 is an F''-norm if and only if the  separate points on

Characterizations

Of (pseudo)metrics induced by (semi)norms

Of pseudometrizable TVS

If  is a topological vector space (TVS) (where note in particular that  is assumed to be a vector topology) then the following are equivalent: 
 is pseudometrizable (i.e. the vector topology  is induced by a pseudometric on ).
 has a countable neighborhood base at the origin.

Of metrizable TVS

If  is a TVS then the following are equivalent:
 is metrizable.
 is Hausdorff and pseudometrizable.
 is Hausdorff and has a countable neighborhood base at the origin.

Of locally convex pseudometrizable TVS

If  is TVS then the following are equivalent: 
 is locally convex and pseudometrizable.
 has a countable neighborhood base at the origin consisting of convex sets.

where  are (continuous) seminorms on

Quotients

Let  be a vector subspace of a topological vector space  
If  is a pseudometrizable TVS then so is 
If  is an F-seminorm on  then the map  defined by

Examples and sufficient conditions

If  is pseudometric TVS with a translation invariant pseudometric  then  defines a paranorm.  However, if  is a translation invariant pseudometric on the vector space  (without the addition condition that  is ), then  need not be either an F-seminorm nor a paranorm.
If a TVS has a bounded neighborhood of the origin then it is pseudometrizable; the converse is in general false.
If a Hausdorff TVS has a bounded neighborhood of the origin then it is metrizable.
Suppose  is either a DF-space or an LM-space. If  is a sequential space then it is either metrizable or else a Montel DF-space.

The strong dual space  of a metrizable locally convex space (such as a Fréchet space)  is a DF-space. 
The strong dual of a DF-space is a Fréchet space. 
The strong dual of a reflexive Fréchet space is a bornological space. 
The strong bidual (that is, the strong dual space of the strong dual space) of a metrizable locally convex space is a Fréchet space.
If  is a metrizable locally convex space then its strong dual  has one of the following properties, if and only if it has all of these properties: (1) bornological, (2) infrabarreled, (3) barreled.

Normability

A topological vector space is seminormable if and only if it has a convex bounded neighborhood of the origin. 
Moreover, a TVS is normable if and only if it is Hausdorff and seminormable. 
Every metrizable TVS on a finite-dimensional vector space is a normable locally convex complete TVS, being TVS-isomorphic to Euclidean space. Consequently, any metrizable TVS that is  normable must be infinite dimensional. 

If  is a metrizable locally convex TVS that possess a countable fundamental system of bounded sets, then  is normable. 

If  is a Hausdorff locally convex space then the following are equivalent:

 is normable.
 has a (von Neumann) bounded neighborhood of the origin.

and if this locally convex space  is also metrizable, then the following may be appended to this list:

In particular, if a metrizable locally convex space  (such as a Fréchet space) is  normable then its strong dual space  is not a Fréchet–Urysohn space and consequently, this complete Hausdorff locally convex space  is also neither metrizable nor normable.

In particular, such a space  is either a Banach space or else it is not even a Fréchet–Urysohn space.

Metrically bounded sets and bounded sets

Suppose that  is a pseudometric space and  
The set  is metrically bounded or -bounded if there exists a real number  such that  for all ; 
the smallest such  is then called the diameter or -diameter of  
If  is bounded in a pseudometrizable TVS  then it is metrically bounded; 
the converse is in general false but it is true for locally convex metrizable TVSs.

Properties of pseudometrizable TVS

Every metrizable locally convex TVS is a quasibarrelled space, bornological space, and a Mackey space.
Every complete metrizable TVS is a barrelled space and a Baire space (and hence non-meager).  However, there exist metrizable Baire spaces that are not complete.
The strong dual of a locally convex metrizable TVS is a webbed space.
F-spaces) and if  is coarser than  then ; this is no longer guaranteed to be true if any one of these metrizable TVSs is not complete.
A metrizable locally convex space is normable if and only if its strong dual space is a Fréchet–Urysohn locally convex space.
Any product of complete metrizable TVSs is a Baire space.
A product of metrizable TVSs is metrizable if and only if it all but at most countably many of these TVSs have dimension 
A product of pseudometrizable TVSs is pseudometrizable if and only if it all but at most countably many of these TVSs have the trivial topology.
Every complete metrizable TVS is a barrelled space and a Baire space (and thus non-meager).
The dimension of a complete metrizable TVS is either finite or uncountable.

Completeness

Every topological vector space (and more generally, a topological group) has a canonical uniform structure, induced by its topology, which allows the notions of completeness and uniform continuity to be applied to it. 
The next theorem gives a condition for when they are equivalent: 

If  is a closed vector subspace of a complete pseudometrizable TVS  then the quotient space  is complete.  
If  is a  vector subspace of a metrizable TVS  and if the quotient space  is complete then so is   If  is not complete then  but not complete, vector subspace of   

A Baire separable topological group is metrizable if and only if it is cosmic.

Subsets and subsequences

Let  be a separable locally convex metrizable topological vector space and let  be its completion. If  is a bounded subset of  then there exists a bounded subset  of  such that 
Every totally bounded subset of a locally convex metrizable TVS  is contained in the closed convex balanced hull of some sequence in  that converges to 
In a pseudometrizable TVS, every bornivore is a neighborhood of the origin.
If  is a translation invariant metric on a vector space  then  for all  and every positive integer 
If  is a null sequence (that is, it converges to the origin) in a metrizable TVS then there exists a sequence  of positive real numbers diverging to  such that 
A subset of a complete metric space is closed if and only if it is complete.  If a space  is not complete, then  is a closed subset of  that is not complete.
If  is a metrizable locally convex TVS then for every bounded subset  of  there exists a bounded disk  in  such that  and both  and the auxiliary normed space  induce the same subspace topology on 

Generalized series

As described in this article's section on generalized series, for any -indexed family family  of vectors from a TVS  it is possible to define their sum  as the limit of the net of finite partial sums  where the domain  is directed by  
If a generalized series  converges in a metrizable TVS, then the set  is necessarily countable (that is, either finite or countably infinite); 
in other words, all but at most countably many  will be zero and so this generalized series  is actually a sum of at most countably many non-zero terms.

Linear maps

Discontinuous linear functionals exist on any infinite-dimensional pseudometrizable TVS.  Thus, a pseudometrizable TVS is finite-dimensional if and only if its continuous dual space is equal to its algebraic dual space.  

 is continuous;
 is sequentially continuous;
 maps null sequences to null sequences;

Open and almost open maps

Theorem: If  is a surjective linear operator from a locally convex space  onto a barrelled space  (e.g. every complete pseudometrizable space is barrelled) then  is almost open.  

Theorem: If  is a surjective linear operator from a TVS  onto a Baire space  then  is almost open.  

Hahn-Banach extension property

A vector subspace  of a TVS  has the extension property if any continuous linear functional on  can be extended to a continuous linear functional on  
Say that a TVS  has the Hahn-Banach extension property (HBEP) if every vector subspace of  has the extension property. 

The Hahn-Banach theorem guarantees that every Hausdorff locally convex space has the HBEP. 
For complete metrizable TVSs there is a converse:

If a vector space  has uncountable dimension and if we endow it with the finest vector topology then this is a TVS with the HBEP that is neither locally convex or metrizable.

See also

Notes

Proofs

References

Bibliography

  
  
 
  
  
  
  
  
  
  
  
  
  
  
  
  
  
  

Metric spaces
Topological vector spaces